Hawley Bennett-Awad (born Hawley Bennett in Langley, British Columbia on 6 May 1977) is a Canadian Equestrian Team athlete who competed for Canada at the 2004 and 2012 Summer Olympics in eventing. She was also on the eventing team that won a team silver medal at the 2011 Pan American Games.

CCI5* results

International Championship Results

Notable Horses 

 Livingstone - 1990 Dark Bay Thoroughbred Gelding (Wander Kind)
 2003 Pan American Games - Team Silver Medal, Individual 15th Place
 2004 Athens Olympics - Team 12th Place, Individual 63rd Place
 2005 FEI Eventing World Cup Final - 15th Place
 Gin & Juice - 2000 Bay Thoroughbred Mare (Audio)
 2010 World Equestrian Games - Team Silver Medal, Individual 17th Place
 2012 London Olympics - Team 12th Place
 2014 World Equestrian Games - Team Sixth Place
 Five O'Clock Somewhere - 2001 Bay Thoroughbred Gelding (Audio)
 2011 Pan American Games - Team Silver Medal, Individual 24th Place
• “Jollybo” 2004 bay british sport horse mare

Personal
Her uncle, Ian Bennett, was the President of the Royal Canadian Mint.

References

External links 

1977 births
Olympic equestrians of Canada
Equestrians at the 2004 Summer Olympics
Equestrians at the 2012 Summer Olympics
People from Langley, British Columbia (city)
Sportspeople from British Columbia
Canadian female equestrians
Pan American Games medalists in equestrian
Pan American Games silver medalists for Canada
Equestrians at the 2003 Pan American Games
Equestrians at the 2011 Pan American Games
Living people
Medalists at the 2003 Pan American Games
Medalists at the 2011 Pan American Games